MTV Unplugged in New York is a live album by American rock band Nirvana, released on November 1, 1994, by DGC Records. It features an acoustic performance recorded at Sony Music Studios in New York City on November 18, 1993, for the television series MTV Unplugged.

The show was directed by Beth McCarthy and aired on the cable television network MTV on December 16, 1993. In a break with MTV Unplugged tradition, Nirvana played mainly lesser-known material and covers of songs by the Vaselines, David Bowie, Lead Belly and Meat Puppets. Unlike prior MTV Unplugged performances, which were entirely acoustic, Nirvana used electric amplification and guitar effects during the set. They were joined by rhythm guitarist Pat Smear and cellist Lori Goldston, alongside Meat Puppets members Cris and Curt Kirkwood for some songs.

MTV Unplugged was released after plans to release the performance as part of a live double-album compilation titled Verse Chorus Verse, were abandoned. It was the first Nirvana release after the death of singer Kurt Cobain seven months prior. It debuted at number one on the US Billboard 200 and was certified 8x platinum by the RIAA in 2020. It won the Best Alternative Music Performance at the 1996 Grammy Awards, making it Nirvana's only Grammy Award win, and has since been ranked one of the greatest live albums of all time. The performance was released as a DVD in 2007.

Background 
MTV Unplugged began airing on MTV in 1989, with artists performing their hits on acoustic instruments in intimate settings. Nirvana had been in negotiations to appear for some time; Nirvana frontman Kurt Cobain finally accepted while touring with the Meat Puppets. Nirvana wanted to do something different from a typical MTV Unplugged performance; according to drummer Dave Grohl, "We'd seen the other Unpluggeds and didn't like many of them, because most bands would treat them like rock shows—play their hits like it was Madison Square Garden, except with acoustic guitars."

The group looked at Mark Lanegan's 1990 album The Winding Sheet, which Cobain had performed on, for inspiration. Among the ideas the band members came up with included covering David Bowie's "The Man Who Sold the World" and inviting members of the Meat Puppets to join them on stage. Still, the prospect of an entirely acoustic show reportedly made Cobain nervous.

Rehearsal 
Nirvana rehearsed for two days, at SST Rehearsal Facility, in Weehawken, New Jersey. The rehearsals were tense and difficult, with the band running into problems performing various songs. During the sessions, Cobain disagreed with MTV about the performance. Producer Alex Coletti recalled that the network was unhappy with the lack of hit Nirvana songs, and with the choice of the Meat Puppets as guests, saying: "They wanted to hear the 'right' names - Eddie Vedder or Tori Amos or God knows who."

The day before filming, Cobain refused to play, but he appeared at the studio the following afternoon. Cobain was suffering from drug withdrawal and nervousness at the time; one observer said, "There was no joking, no smiles, no fun coming from him ... everyone was more than a little worried about his performance."

Recording 
Nirvana taped their performance on November 18, 1993, at Sony Studios in New York City. Cobain suggested the stage be decorated with stargazer lilies, black candles, and a crystal chandelier. Producer Alex Coletti asked, "You mean like a funeral?" Cobain replied, "Exactly. Like a funeral."

Nirvana was joined by guitarist Pat Smear and cellist Lori Goldston, who had been touring with them. Despite the show's acoustic premise, Cobain insisted on running his acoustic guitar through his amplifier and effects pedals. Coletti built a fake box in front of the amplifier to disguise it as a monitor wedge. Coletti said, "It was Kurt's security blanket. He was used to hearing this guitar through his Fender. He wanted those effects. You can hear it on 'The Man Who Sold the World'. It's an acoustic guitar, but he's obviously going through an amp."

Unlike many artists who appeared on the show, Nirvana filmed the entire performance of 14 songs in a single take. It included one song from their debut Bleach (1989), four from their second album Nevermind (1991), three from the recently released In Utero, and six covers. As In Utero's "All Apologies" had not yet been released as a single, the only contemporary hit the band performed was the Nevermind single "Come as You Are".

Cris and Curt Kirkwood of the Meat Puppets joined to perform three of their songs with Nirvana. "Kurt purposely wanted the Meat Puppets songs to be a struggle for him vocally," remarked Coletti. "So instead of finding a key he could sing them in comfortably, he chose to strain."

The set ended with a performance of the traditional "Where Did You Sleep Last Night", following the arrangement of blues musician Lead Belly, whom Cobain described before the song as "his favorite performer ever". Mark Lanegan had covered this song previously on The Winding Sheet (1990) with Cobain on guitar. After the band finished, Cobain argued with the show's producers, who wanted an encore. Cobain refused because he felt he could not top the performance of that song.

Release 
The Nirvana episode of MTV Unplugged was first broadcast in December 1993. It was 45 minutes long and omitted the songs "Something in the Way" and "Oh Me". After Cobain was found dead in April 1994, MTV aired the episode repeatedly. To meet demand for new Nirvana material and to counter bootlegging, in August 1994, DGC announced a double album, Verse Chorus Verse, comprising live performances including the entire MTV Unplugged performance. However, the task of compiling the album was too emotionally difficult for Novoselic and Grohl, so the project was cancelled a week after the announcement; the group opted to release just the Unplugged performance. Scott Litt, who produced the performance, returned to produce the record. The performance was released on DVD in 2007.

Reception 
MTV Unplugged in New York was released on November 1, 1994. It debuted at number one on the Billboard 200 and sold 310,500 copies, the highest first-week sales of Nirvana's career. By March 1995, the album had outsold In Utero with 6.8 million copies sold.

The album received positive reviews from critics. Tom Hibbert of Q said that as an acoustic ensemble, Nirvana sounded "most moving, possessed of a ragged glory". Rolling Stone writer Barbara O'Dair found the record "stirring and occasionally brilliant" with "spare and gorgeous spots everywhere", highlighting the band's chemistry on "All Apologies" and Cobain's unaccompanied performance of "Pennyroyal Tea". Ben Thompson from Mojo felt that unlike most "unplugged" releases, the format's "colourless, generic aspect" and not seeing the actual performance benefits Nirvana's record because of how intense it seems in light of Cobain's death. In Entertainment Weekly, David Browne felt unsettled listening to it: "Beyond inducing a sense of loss for Cobain himself, Unplugged elicits a feeling of musical loss, too: the delicacy and intimacy of these acoustic rearrangements hint at where Nirvana (or at least Cobain, who was said to be frustrated with the limitations of the band) could have gone."

MTV Unplugged in New York was voted the fourth best album of the year in Pazz & Jop, an annual poll of prominent American critics published by The Village Voice. Robert Christgau, the poll's supervisor, also ranked the album fourth in his own year-end list, deeming it a testament to Cobain's depth of feeling, "sincerity" as a vocalist, and distinction from other sensitive alternative rock types such as Eddie Vedder and Lou Barlow: "The vocal performance he evokes is John Lennon's on John Lennon/Plastic Ono Band. And he did it in one take."

Retrospective
In a retrospective review for AllMusic, senior editor Stephen Thomas Erlewine said MTV Unplugged in New York was "fearlessly confessional", as it found Nirvana and Cobain "on the verge of discovering a new sound and style". Jason Mendelsohn from PopMatters believed its intimate folk rock quality was radical from Nirvana and Cobain, "as crass of a business move as it was" by their record label. In The Rolling Stone Album Guide (2004), journalist Charles M. Young called it Nirvana's "second masterpiece" after Nevermind, and claimed that Cobain could have "revolutionized folk music the same way he had rock" because of his striking voice; he said his songs worked equally well with "a loud band bashing away behind you" or "with just an acoustic guitar". Maeve McDermott of USA Today called it "an album of transcendent folk rock that glimpsed what could’ve been the band’s next post-grunge era, had frontman Kurt Cobain survived long enough to see its musical leanings through."

In 2007, episode 6 of the BBC's Seven Ages of Rock called the band's performance of "Where Did You Sleep Last Night" a surreal requiem for Cobain.  A 2013 article by critic Andrew Wallace Chamings in The Atlantic noted the song as one of the greatest live performances of all time, writing:

According to Acclaimed Music, MTV Unplugged in New York is the 309th most ranked record on critics' all-time lists. In 2012, it was placed at number 313 on Rolling Stones list of The 500 Greatest Albums of All Time. The 2020 edition of the list placed it at number 279. Rolling Stone also named it the 95th best album of the 1990s. The readers rated it the 8th best live album of all time. NME placed MTV Unplugged in New York at number 1 on their list of the "50 Greatest Live Albums". Kerrang listed it among the 11 best live albums of all time. In July 2014, Guitar World ranked MTV Unplugged in New York at number 30 in their "Superunknown: 50 Iconic Albums That Defined 1994" list. The same magazine listed it at number 4 on their list of "The 10 Best Live Albums You Must Hear". Far Out magazine also included it at number 4 on their list of the best 20 live albums of all time. In 2020, The Telegraph included it at number 13 on their list of the best live albums of all time. Also in 2020, Planet Rock magazine included the album in their list of "The 100 Greatest Live Albums Ever". The album was also included in the book 1001 Albums You Must Hear Before You Die.

Reviewing the MTV Unplugged in New York DVD release in 2007, the Los Angeles Times wrote that it "deserves a place on the rock TV history shelf alongside the informal, sit-down section of Elvis Presley’s epic comeback special in 1968". In June 2020, the 1959 Martin D-18E guitar used by Cobain at the Unplugged concert was sold at Julien's Auctions for US$6 million to Peter Freedman of Røde Microphones, making it the most expensive guitar ever sold at auction.

Track listing

Personnel 
Nirvana
Kurt Cobain – lead vocals, electro-acoustic guitar (1–9, 13, 14)
Krist Novoselic – acoustic bass (1, 2, 4, 6-9, 13, 14) accordion (3), acoustic rhythm guitar (10–12)
Dave Grohl – drums (1, 2, 4, 6-14), backing vocals, acoustic bass & percussion (3)
Pat Smear – acoustic guitar (1–4, 6–9, 13, 14)
Additional musicians
Lori Goldston – cello (3, 4, 6–9, 13, 14)
Cris Kirkwood – acoustic bass, backing vocals (10–12)
Curt Kirkwood – acoustic lead guitar (10–12)

Production
Alex Coletti – production
Robert Fisher – art direction, design
Scott Litt – production
Stephen Marcussen – mastering
Frank Micelotta – photography
Jennifer Youngblood-Grohl – photography  
Nirvana – production

Charts

Weekly charts

Year-end charts

Decade-end charts

Certifications

DVD release
The MTV Unplugged In New York performance was released on DVD on November 20, 2007. The DVD release featured the entire taping, in 5.1 DTS surround sound, including the two songs ("Something in the Way" and "Oh Me") excluded from the broadcast version. Bonus features consisted of the original broadcast version of the performance, a 1999 MTV special titled Bare Witness: Nirvana Unplugged featuring the recollections of MTV producers and audience members, and five full-band songs taped during the pre-show rehearsal: "Come as You Are", "Polly", "Plateau", "Pennyroyal Tea", and "The Man Who Sold the World".

Charts

Certifications

References 
Footnotes

Bibliography
 Cross, Charles R. Heavier Than Heaven: A Biography of Kurt Cobain. Hyperion, 2001.

External links 
 

MTV Unplugged in New York at YouTube (streamed copy where licensed)
 MTV Unplugged in New York at Acclaimed Music (list of accolades)
 

Albums produced by Scott Litt
DGC Records live albums
MTV Unplugged albums
Live albums published posthumously
Nirvana (band) live albums
Nirvana (band) video albums
1994 live albums
2007 video albums
Video albums published posthumously
Grammy Award for Best Alternative Music Album
Meat Puppets
Folk rock albums by American artists
Television shows directed by Beth McCarthy-Miller